Séamus Dolan (10 December 1914 – 10 August 2010) was an Irish Fianna Fáil politician. He was a Teachta Dála (TD) from 1961 to 1965, and a Senator from 1965 to 1969 and from 1973 to 1982. He was Cathaoirleach  of Seanad Éireann from 1977 to 1981.

Born in Gubaveeney, near Blacklion in County Cavan, he was a farmer and national school teacher before entering politics. Dolan was elected in 1961 to Dáil Éireann for the Cavan constituency (which he had contested unsuccessfully at the 1954 and 1957 elections). He lost his seat at the 1965 general election, and although he stood in the next two general elections (in 1969 and 1973), he never returned to the Dáil.

However, after his 1965 defeat, he was elected to the 11th Seanad Éireann on the Labour Panel. He did not seek re-election in 1969, but was returned in 1973 to the 13th Seanad. From 1977 to 1981 he was Cathaoirleach of the 14th Seanad (1981–1982) and as Leas-Chathaoirleach in the 15th Seanad.

He was a fluent Irish speaker (Gaeilgóir) and dedicated much of his time to promoting the language, as well as teaching its value and importance in his day. He was one of the few native Irish speakers in County Cavan and raised his family through the medium.

Séamus Dolan died on 10 August 2010.

References

 

1914 births
2010 deaths
Fianna Fáil TDs
Cathaoirligh of Seanad Éireann
Members of the 17th Dáil
Members of the 11th Seanad
Members of the 13th Seanad
Members of the 14th Seanad
Members of the 15th Seanad
Politicians from County Cavan
Irish farmers
Irish schoolteachers
Fianna Fáil senators